Katandra West is a small town in Victoria, Australia. It is located in the City of Greater Shepparton.

The town is the home base of the Katandra Football Club. Katandra fields football and netball teams in the Murray Football League.

References

External links

Towns in Victoria (Australia)
City of Greater Shepparton